Global Currents is a Canadian news television series, which aired weekly on Global Television Network. Hosted by Kevin Newman, the series airs one documentary film each week.

The series originally launched in 2005, replacing the newsmagazine series Global Sunday. Initially, there was no umbrella title for the series, with each week's documentary promoted under its own individual title. The title Global Currents began to be used in 2007.

The series was shown Saturday evenings at 7 p.m., save for the autumn of 2007 when it was shown at 10 p.m.

Episode list

2006

2007

2008

External links
 Global Currents

2000s Canadian documentary television series
Global Television Network original programming
2005 Canadian television series debuts
2008 Canadian television series endings
Television series by Corus Entertainment